General elections were held in Tanzania on 29 October 2000, with sixteen constituencies in Zanzibar voting again on 5 November due to problems with distributing election material. The second general elections since the restoration of multi-party democracy in 1992, they were won by the ruling Chama Cha Mapinduzi party, which claimed 202 of the 231 constituency seats in the National Assembly, and whose candidate, Benjamin Mkapa, winning the presidential election.

After the election, 48 additional seats for women MPs were awarded to the parties based on the proportion of seats in the National Assembly, whilst five members were elected by the House of Representatives of Zanzibar, ten members were nominated by the President, and the Attorney General was also an ex officio member, giving a total number of MPs of 285.

Voter turnout was 84.43% of the 10,088,484 registered voters.

Results

President

National Assembly

References

Presidential elections in Tanzania
Elections in Tanzania
Tanzania
2000 elections in Tanzania